The Sound of the Sand and Other Songs of the Pedestrian is the debut studio album by experimental singer-songwriter David Thomas. Originally released on October 30, 1981, by Rough Trade Records, the album was remastered in 1997 by Paul Hamann and David Thomas for its inclusion in the Monster anthology box set.

Track listing

Musicians
Adapted from The Sound of the Sand and Other Songs of the Pedestrian liner notes.

The Pedestrians (A1, A2, A4, A5, B1, B4, B6)
 Anton Fier – drums and percussion
 John Greaves – bass guitar (A5, B4)
 Philip Moxham – bass guitar
 Allen Ravenstine – synthesizer
 David Thomas – lead vocals
 Richard Thompson – guitar and dulcimer
 Eddie "Tan Tan" Thornton – trumpet
 Mayo Thompson – accordion (B6)
The Golden Palominos (A3, B3)
 Anton Fier – drums and percussion
 John Greaves – bass guitar, piano
 Richard Thompson – guitar and dulcimer
 Eddie "Tan Tan" Thornton – trumpet
The Trees (B2)
 Ralph Carney – saxophone and oboe
 Alan Greenblatt – guitar
 Paul Hamann – bass guitar
 Scott Krauss – drums
 Allen Ravenstine – synthesizer
The Eggs (B5)
 Chris Cutler – drums
 Eddie "Tan Tan" Thornton – trumpet

Production and additional personnel
 Phil Bodger – assistant engineer
 Anne Clarke – assistant producer
 Paul Hamann – engineering
 Sue Johnson – assistant producer
 Adam Kidron – production, engineering, mixing, mastering
 Martyn Lambert – design
 Mik Mellen – photography
 Shirley O'Loughlin – assistant producer
 David Thomas – design
 Geoff Travis – executive producer
 Peter Walmsley – production, design

Release history

References

External links 
 

David Thomas (musician) albums
1981 debut albums
Rough Trade Records albums
Albums produced by Adam Kidron